New Bolingbroke railway station was a station which served the village of New Bolingbroke in East Lindsey, Lincolnshire. The station was on the Kirkstead and Little Steeping Railway which ran between Lincoln and Firsby. The branch line was sometimes called the "New Line". The station and line opened in 1913 and closed in 1970. The site is now occupied by a reclaimers and antiques yard.

References

Disused railway stations in Lincolnshire
Former Great Northern Railway stations
Railway stations in Great Britain opened in 1913
Railway stations in Great Britain closed in 1915
Railway stations in Great Britain opened in 1923
Railway stations in Great Britain closed in 1970
1913 establishments in England
Beeching closures in England